"Meet Me on the Dark Side" is a song by Canadian alternative rock musician, Melissa Auf der Maur. The song was written by Auf der Maur and recorded during the session for her second studio album, Out of Our Minds (2010), from 2005 to 2007. The song was produced by Auf der Maur's long-time collaborator Jordon Zadorozny.

The song was released as Auf der Maur's fourth single, and the second single from Out of Our Minds, in October 2010.

Track listing
Canadian CD single
"Meet Me on the Dark Side" - 04:08
"Meet Me on the Dark Side" (Black Light Odyssey remix) - 04:56

European promo CD
"Meet Me on the Dark Side" - 04:08

Personnel
Musicians
Melissa Auf der Maur - vocals, bass, guitar, keys
Steve Durand - guitar
Camila Grey - harpsichord
Josh Freese - drums, percussion

Technical personnel
Jordon Zadorozny - producer, engineer
Melissa Auf der Maur - producer
Mike Fraser - mixing

References

2010 songs
2010 singles
Songs written by Melissa Auf der Maur
Roadrunner Records singles
Melissa Auf der Maur songs